The Blessing is the third live album by Kari Jobe. The album was released on October 23, 2020, via Sparrow Records. The album features guest appearances by Cody Carnes. The album was produced by Cody Carnes, Austin Davis, Henry Seeley, Jacob Sooter, and McKendree Tucker.

The album was supported by the release of its title track as the lead single. The song peaked at No. 2  on the Hot Christian Songs, and has been certified gold by Recording Industry Association of America (RIAA). The album was also supported by the release of six promotional singles. To further promote the album, Jobe embarked on The Blessing USA Tour.

The album garnered mixed reviews from critics. It achieved commercial success, debuting at No. 3 on Billboard's Top Christian Albums Chart in the United States, and No. 7 on the OCC's Official Christian & Gospel Albums Chart in the United Kingdom. The Blessing was nominated for the GMA Dove Award Worship Album of the Year and Recorded Music Packaging of the Year at the 2021 GMA Dove Awards. The album was also nominated for the Grammy Award for Best Contemporary Christian Music Album at the 2022 Grammy Awards.

Background
On September 18, 2020, Kari Jobe announced her first new album in over three years, The Blessing, serving as a follow-up to The Garden (2017). The album was recorded live at her church, The Belonging Co, in Nashville, without an audience during the COVID-19 pandemic, and was slated for release on October 23, 2020. The album featured songwriting contributions from notable songwriters such as Cody Carnes, Jonas Myrin, Steffany Gretzinger, Elevation Worship's Chris Brown and Steven Furtick, and Passion's Kristian Stanfill among others.

Release and promotion

Singles
On March 20, 2020, Kari Jobe alongside Cody Carnes and Elevation Worship released "The Blessing" as a single. The song debuted at No. 3 and No. 4 on the Hot Christian Songs and the Digital Song Sales charts dated April 24, 2020, respectively. The song peaked at No. 2 on the Hot Christian Songs chart, and No. 15 on the Bubbling Under Hot 100 chart. "The Blessing" was certified gold by Recording Industry Association of America (RIAA).

Promotional singles
On September 18, 2020, Kari Jobe launched the album pre-order with the release of three promotional singles: "First Love", "Embers", and "Obsession" which featured Cody Carnes. "First Love" peaked at No. 31 on the Hot Christian Songs chart.

On October 2, 2020, Jobe released "Let the Light In" as the fourth promotional single from the album. "Let the Light In" peaked at No. 34 on the Hot Christian Songs chart.

On October 8, 2020, Jobe released "Your Nature" as the fifth promotional single from the album. "Let the Light In" peaked at No. 34 on the Hot Christian Songs chart.

On October 14, 2020, Jobe released "Heaven Invade" as the sixth and final promotional single from the album.

Touring
On February 12, 2021, Kari Jobe announced The Blessing USA Tour in conjunction with Premier Productions. Cody Carnes was also a featured performer of the tour. The tour spanned twenty-two cities across the United States, beginning on April 15, 2021, in Pittsburgh, Pennsylvania, and concluded on May 23, 2021, in Wichita, Kansas.

Reception

Critical response

The Blessing has garnered mixed reviews from critics of CCM and contemporary worship music genres. 

Jessie Clarks of The Christian Beat wrote a favourable review of the album, concluding that the songs "encompass a deep and personal trust and love in God," while the lyrics and music were "a combination that will bring worship to any listening situation." In a positive review for Worship Leader, Randy Cross said of the album: "provides a momentous amount of music that is directly focused on the main thing," while noting that the listening experience is best done "in meaningful portions, instead of all at one sitting." Reviewing for NewReleaseToday, Jasmin Patterson concluded on the album: "It's quickly become one of my favorite worship releases this year. I think it will be one of yours, too."

CCM Magazine's Dan MacIntosh gave a negative review of the album, opining that while the spontaneous moments are the best features of Jobe's concerts, it "doesn't always translate as successfully into an audio recording." Reviewing for JubileeCast, Timothy Yap also wrote a unfavourable review of the album, noting that while fans who like "Jobe's crescendo-style of worship" will enjoy the record, it had several flaws such as vague and superficial lyrical content, as well as sameness of sound.

Accolades

Commercial performance
In the United States, The Blessing debuted at number three on the Billboard Top Christian Albums chart dated November 7, 2020. The Blessing also debuted on the OCC's Official Christian & Gospel Albums Chart at No. 7.

Track listing

Personnel

Credits adapted from Tidal, and AllMusic.
 Cody Carnes — primary artist, producer
 Austin Davis — producer
 Sam Gibson — mastering engineer, mixing
 Ted Jensen — mastering engineer
 Kari Jobe — primary artist
 Henry Seeley — producer
 Justin Shurtz — mastering engineer
 Jacob Sooter — producer
 McKendree Tucker — producer

Charts

Weekly charts

Year-end charts

Release history

References

External links
 

2020 albums
Kari Jobe albums